The Definitive America is a compilation album by American rock band America, released in 2001. The album was certified Platinum in Australia.

Track listing

Personnel 
 Gerry Beckley – lead and backing vocals, keyboards, guitars, bass, harmonica
 Dewey Bunnell – lead and backing vocals, guitars, percussion 
 Dan Peek – lead and backing vocals, guitars, bass, keyboards, harmonica
 David Dickey - bass (tracks: 8 to 10, 13 to 19)
 Joe Osborne - bass (tracks: 4 to 7) 
 Chris McCracken - congas (tracks: 8 to 10) 
 Hal Blaine - drums, percussion (tracks: 4 to 10)
 Willie Leacox - drums, percussion (tracks: 11 to 19)
 Robert Margouleff - synthesizer (tracks: 8 to 10)

Charts

Certifications

References 

America (band) albums
2001 compilation albums
Rhino Records compilation albums
Warner Records compilation albums
Albums produced by George Martin